Akbarabad (also Romanized as Akbarābād) is a village in Mian Rokh Rural District, Jolgeh Rokh District, Torbat-e Heydarieh County, Razavi Khorasan Province, Iran. At the 2006 census, its population was 183, in 41 families.

See also 

 List of cities, towns and villages in Razavi Khorasan Province

References 

Populated places in Torbat-e Heydarieh County